Hawalaat is a 1987 Indian Hindi-language film directed by Surendra Mohan, it stars Shatrughan Sinha, Mithun Chakraborty, Rishi Kapoor, Padmini Kolhapure, Mandakini, Anita Raj in lead roles.

Plot
Geeta works for a newspaper as a reporter and exposes the drug-running crimes of Dharamdas and others involved with him, and as a result she is abducted, imprisoned, and raped repeatedly by both the criminals and a police inspector. Who will save her and others from the clutches of the criminals?

Music
Lyrics: Gulshan Bawra

Cast
Shatrughan Sinha as CID Inspector Sikander Ali Khan / Gullu Badshah 
Rishi Kapoor as Shyam 
Mithun Chakraborty as Mangal Dada 
Padmini Kolhapure as Geeta 
Mandakini as Leela 
Anita Raj as CID Inspector Shamim Khan / Salma
Prem Chopra as Dr. Prem Pal
Gulshan Grover as Inspector Sharma 
Dalip Tahil as Shaikh Ibrahim
Amrish Puri as Dharamdas 
Om Prakash as Raghu (Drug Addict Prisoner) 
Sudhir Dalvi as Kailash (Truck Driver)
Seema Deo as Parvati 
Mukri as Director (Guest Appearance) 
Om Shivpuri as Minister 
Rakesh Bedi as Constable Handa

External links
 
 https://archive.today/20130126063543/http://ibosnetwork.com/asp/filmbodetails.asp?id=Hawalaat

1987 films
1980s Hindi-language films
Indian action films
Films scored by Anu Malik
1987 action films
Films directed by Surendra Mohan